The 4 × 400 metres relay races at the 2000 Summer Olympics as part of the athletics program were held on 29 and 30 September. The top two teams in each of the initial five heats automatically qualified for the semi-final. The next six fastest teams from across the heats also qualified. The top three teams in each of the semi-finals automatically qualified for the final. The next two fastest team from the semi-finals also qualified.

The United States, with Alvin Harrison, Antonio Pettigrew, Calvin Harrison and Michael Johnson, originally won the gold medal.  On 18 July 2004, the International Association of Athletics Federations (IAAF) ruled that Jerome Young was ineligible to compete in Sydney and annulled all his past results, including those achieved as part of relay teams. Young had competed for the USA team in the heats and semi-final of this event. Therefore, the United States team was stripped of the gold medal and Nigeria, Jamaica, and the Bahamas were moved up one position each. On 22 July 2005, the Court of Arbitration for Sport (CAS) overturned this decision and restored the original finish order of the race based on a ruling that a team should be disqualified because of a doping offense by an athlete who did not compete in the finals.

In June 2008, Antonio Pettigrew "admitted in U.S. court that he breached the rules" by using banned performance-enhancing substances, and agreed to return his gold medal. Michael Johnson announced that he would return his own gold medal, won as part of the relay team with Pettigrew. Johnson stated that he felt "cheated, betrayed and let down" by what Pettigrew had done at the Games. On 12 July 2012, the IOC confirmed the medal reallocation.

Records
These were the standing world and Olympic records (in minutes) prior to the 2000 Summer Olympics.

Medalists

* Athletes who participated in the heats only and received medals.

The IOC formally withdrew the US gold medals on 2 August 2008.

Results

Heats

Round 1- Overall

Semi-finals

Final

References

External links
Results, round 1 - IAAF
Results, semi-final - IAAF
Results, final - IAAF

Athletics at the 2000 Summer Olympics
Relay foot races at the Olympics
Men's events at the 2000 Summer Olympics